Brenda Bailey is a Canadian politician, who was elected to the Legislative Assembly of British Columbia in the 2020 British Columbia general election. She represents the electoral district of Vancouver-False Creek as a member of the British Columbia New Democratic Party.

Prior to her election, Bailey had served as the Executive Director of Big Sisters of BC Lower Mainland, and served as Executive Director of DigiBC, the Interactive and Digital Media Industry Association of British Columbia. In 2010, she cofounded Silicon Sisters, the first Canadian video game studio owned and run solely by women.

Electoral Record

References

21st-century Canadian politicians
21st-century Canadian women politicians
British Columbia New Democratic Party MLAs
Businesspeople from Vancouver
Canadian business executives
Women MLAs in British Columbia
Politicians from Vancouver
Living people
Year of birth missing (living people)